Salisbury High School may refer to:

Australia
Salisbury State High School  in Salisbury, Brisbane, Queensland; merged into Nyanda State High School in 1997.
Salisbury High School (South Australia) in Salisbury North, South Australia

Canada
Salisbury Composite High School in Sherwood Park, Alberta
J.M.A. Armstrong/Salisbury Middle School in Salisbury, New Brunswick

United Kingdom
Salisbury High School (Wiltshire, England)

United States
Salisbury High School (California) in Red Bluff, California
Salisbury School in Salisbury, Connecticut
The Salisbury School (Maryland) in Salisbury, Maryland
Salisbury High School (Missouri) in Salisbury, Missouri
Salisbury High School (North Carolina) in Salisbury, North Carolina
Salisbury High School (Pennsylvania) in Allentown, Pennsylvania
Salisbury-Elk Lick Junior/Senior High School in Salisbury, Somerset County, Pennsylvania